Thoise or Thoise Airbase is a military airfield  and small village in Nubra region of Ladakh, India, occupying the only large piece of flat land in the area. The airstrip is a critical facility enabling a quick inflow of men and material from the Indian interior to Siachen, a glacier, helipad and battleground near the Actual Ground Position Line between India and Pakistan.

Thoise is nearly 16 km from Hundar, 25 km from Diskit and the road further leads to Turtuk which lies near India-Pakistan Line of Control (LoC). It is about 160 km from Leh, the capital of Ladakh. Thoise is reached via the Khardung La mountain pass, one of the world's highest roads used by motor vehicles.

Thoise is out of bounds for civilians. The last checkpost is at Hundar, at a bridge where photography is not permitted. Indian Oil Corporation Limited is building an oil depot to serve the Indian Army. The construction project is in progress and is monitored from Chandigarh.

Background

Etymology

THOISE is not a real name but an acronym: Transit Halt Of Indian Soldiers Enroute (to Siachen).  Thoise is about an hour and 20 minutes flight from Delhi. Air India has limited flight operations from "Thoise" to Delhi (Flight AI 3832). Jet Airways operated flights to THOISE until the decision was made to curtail operations due to financial non-viability towards the end of January 2019. With less than 12 qualified commercial pilots the world over, this is an extremely tricky airfield to operate into. Special background clearance and multiple stringent skill tests must be passed by the pilots in order to be able to operate to Thoise.

History 

On 30 Apr 2019, Group Captain Sandeep Singh Chhabra of the Indian Air Force achieved the rare distinction of having completed 1,000 incident-free landings of the Russian-origin heavy lift IL-76 aircraft at Leh and Thoise.

Military and Air Base 
Due to the extreme conditions and lack of connectivity with the outside world, IAF aircraft have been instrumental in the resupply of this remote region. IAF's IL-76 aircraft are all operated by No.44 Squadron, which is based at the Chandigarh Air Force Station. Capable of airlifting up to 45 tonnes of payload, these aircraft have played an instrumental role in ferrying men and equipment, including tanks, artillery guns and construction equipment to the northern sector. They have also airlifted large quantities of relief material during disaster management in cases of natural calamities, and have undertaken overseas missions.

See also

 Military bases 
 List of ALGs
 List of Indian Air Force stations
 India-China military deployment on LAC
 List of disputed India-China areas
 Tianwendian
 Ukdungle

 Borders
 Actual Ground Position Line (AGPL)
 India–Pakistan International Border (IB)
 Line of Control (LoC)
 Line of Actual Control (LAC)
 Sir Creek (SC)
 Borders of China
 Borders of India
 
 Conflicts
 Kashmir conflict
 Siachen conflict
 Sino-Indian conflict
 List of disputed territories of China
 List of disputed territories of India
 List of disputed territories of Pakistan
 Northern Areas
 Trans-Karakoram Tract

 Operations
 Operation Meghdoot, by India
 Operation Rajiv, by India
 Operation Safed Sagar, by India

 Other related topics
 India-China Border Roads
 List of extreme points of India
 Sino-Pakistan Agreement for transfer of Trans-Karakoram Tract to China
 Defence Institute of High Altitude Research
 Indian Astronomical Observatory

References

External links
 Pilots' reports and pictures
 

Siachen conflict
Indian Air Force bases
Airports in Ladakh
Ladakh
Villages in Nubra tehsil